Jalan Gelang Patah–Skudai (Johor state route J4) is a major road in Iskandar Puteri, Johor, Malaysia.

List of junctions

Gelang Patah-Skudai